Platyptilia cretalis is a moth of the family Pterophoridae. It is found in the Honshu, Kyushu and Tsushima islands of Japan.

The length of the forewings is 9–12 mm. Adults are on wing from May to September.

The larvae feed on the flowering legume Desmodium racemosum. They feed on the sprout, terminal young leaf and usually the terminal stem of the host plant. The pupa attaches itself to the under surface of the midrib of a leaf and directs to the base of a leaf.

External links
Taxonomic And Biological Studies Of Pterophoridae Of Japan (Lepidoptera)
Japanese Moths

cretalis
Endemic fauna of Japan
Moths of Japan
Moths described in 1908